Nichola Louise Beck (born 1973) is a former English badminton international player and a former national champion.

Biography 
Beck became an English national champion after winning the English National Badminton Championships women's doubles title with Joanne Davies in 1997. The pair had previously finished runner-up in 1995.

She represented Buckinghamshire. In 1994, she won the silver medal at the World University Championships in the mixed doubles partnered with John Quinn.

Achievements

IBF World Grand Prix 
The World Badminton Grand Prix sanctioned by International Badminton Federation (IBF) since 1983.

Women's doubles

IBF International 
Women's doubles

Mixed doubles

References 

1973 births
Living people
People from Ealing
English female badminton players